Cheshmeh Jiuri may refer to:
 Cheshmeh Jiuri Montangun